Santa María District is a district (distrito) of Herrera Province in Panama. The population according to the 2000 census was 6,992. The district covers a total area of 158 km². The capital lies at the city of Santa María.

Administrative divisions
Santa María District is divided administratively into the following corregimientos:

Santa María (capital)
Chupampa
El Rincón
El Limón
Los Canelos

References

Districts of Panama
Herrera Province